The 2017 Four Continents Figure Skating Championships was an international figure skating competition in the 2016–17 figure skating season. It was held at the Gangneung Ice Arena in Gangneung, South Korea on February 16–19. Medals were awarded in the disciplines of men's singles, ladies' singles, pair skating, and ice dancing. The competition served as the figure skating test event for the 2018 Winter Olympics in Pyeongchang.

Qualification
The competition was open to skaters from non-European member nations of the International Skating Union who reached the age of 15 before July 1, 2016. The corresponding competition for European skaters was the 2017 European Figure Skating Championships.

Each National Federation from the four represented regions were permitted to send up to three skaters/couples for each discipline. National Federations could select their entries based on their own criteria, as long as the selected skater/couples attained a minimum technical elements score (TES) at an international senior event prior to the Four Continents.

Minimum TES

Entries
A total of 111 athletes (26 men, 23 ladies, 15 pair teams, and 16 ice dancing teams) competed at the championship. The ISU published a list of entries on 27 January:

Changes to initial assignments

Competition schedule
All times are Korea Standard Time (UTC+9).

Results

Men

Ladies

Pairs

Ice dancing

Medals summary

Medalists
Medals for overall placement:

Small medals for placement in the short segment:

Small medals for placement in the free segment:

Medals by country
Table of medals for overall placement:

Table of small medals for placement in the short segment:

Table of small medals for placement in the free segment:

Prize money
Prize money was awarded to skaters who achieved a top-8 placement in the men's and ladies' events, a top-5 placement in the pair's event, and a top-6 placement in the ice dance event:

References

External links
 International Skating Union
 Four Continents Figure Skating Championships

Four Continents Figure Skating Championships
Four Continents Figure Skating Championships, 2017
Four Continents
2017 in South Korean sport
International figure skating competitions hosted by South Korea
Figure skating